Scotland and Wales have played each other at rugby union since 1883. A total of 129 matches have been played, with Wales winning 75 matches, Scotland winning 51 matches and three matches drawn.

Scotland and Wales play each other at least once a year, as both have been in the Six Nations Championship, and its predecessor competitions.

Since 2018 the winners of a Scotland and Wales match will receive the Doddie Weir Cup.

Summary

Overall

Records
Note: Date shown in brackets indicates when the record was or last set.

Results

References

Wales national rugby union team matches
Scotland national rugby union team matches
Six Nations Championship
Rugby union rivalries in Wales
Rugby union rivalries in Scotland